The 1947 New Zealand tour rugby to Australia was the 17th tour by the New Zealand national rugby union team to Australia. 

The last tour of "All Blacks" in Australia was the 1938 tour, then in 1946 were the Australians to visit New Zealand.

All Blacks won both the test matches and the Bledisloe Cup

The tour 
Scores and results list All Blacks points tally first.

Post-tour match 

Scores and results list All Blacks points tally first.

External links 
 New Zealand in Australia 1947 from rugbymuseum.co.nz

New Zealand
New Zealand tour
Australia tour
New Zealand national rugby union team tours of Australia